Downtown Mocksville Historic District is a national historic district located at Mocksville, Davie County, North Carolina. The district encompasses 21 contributing buildings and 1 contributing object in the central business district of Mocksville. It primarily includes residential and commercial buildings with notable examples of Classical Revival and Beaux-Arts style architecture.  The district includes the previously listed Davie County Courthouse.  Other notable buildings include the Davie County Jail (1916), (former) C. C. Sanford Sons Store (1937), (former) J. T. Baity/Anderson Store (1906, 1915), (former) Meroney Hardware Company Building (1922-1924), Sanford Brothers Building (1927), (former) Southern Bank &. Trust Company Building (1923), (former) Princess Theatre, J. T. Angell Building (1910), Horn Service Station, (former) Kurfees and Ward Pure Oil Station, (former) Meroney Filling Station, and Johnstone Office Building (1939).

It was added to the National Register of Historic Places in 1990.

References

Historic districts on the National Register of Historic Places in North Carolina
Neoclassical architecture in North Carolina
Beaux-Arts architecture in North Carolina
Buildings and structures in Davie County, North Carolina
National Register of Historic Places in Davie County, North Carolina